Anaphase-promoting complex subunit 4 is an enzyme that in humans is encoded by the ANAPC4 gene.

A large protein complex, termed the anaphase-promoting complex (APC), or the cyclosome, promotes metaphase-anaphase transition by ubiquitinating its specific substrates such as mitotic cyclins and anaphase inhibitor, which are subsequently degraded by the 26S proteasome. Biochemical studies have shown that the vertebrate APC contains eight subunits. The composition of the APC is highly conserved in organisms from yeast to humans. The exact function of this gene product is not known.

Interactions 

ANAPC4 has been shown to interact with ANAPC1, ANAPC5, CDC27 and ANAPC7.

References

External links

Further reading